Light We Made is the third and thus far final studio album from American rock band Balance and Composure. It was released on October 7, 2016 through Vagrant Records and Big Scary Monsters throughout Europe.

Track listing

Charting

References

2016 albums
Balance and Composure albums
Vagrant Records albums
Albums produced by Will Yip